Kennedy Musyoka Kalonzo is a Kenyan lawyer and politician, who is a member of the fourth East African Legislative Assembly (2017—2022), representing Kenya.

He was nominated to the regional legislative body (EALA), by the Wiper Democratic Movement political party, in June 2017. He was elected to the EALA by both chambers of the Kenyan Parliament in December 2017.

Background and education
He was born in Kenya in 1987. He is the first-born to former Vice President of Kenya Stephen Kalonzo Musyoka and his wife Pauline Musyoka.

Kennedy attended Brookhouse School, in Lang'ata, Nairobi County, where he obtained his High School Diploma. His first degree, a Bachelor of Arts in International Affairs, Politics and Public Policy, was awarded by the University of Newcastle (Australia), in 2010.

His second degree, a Bachelor of Laws, was awarded by the University of Nairobi in 2014. He has also undergone the Advocate Training Programme at the Kenya School of Law.

Work experience
After he completed his first degree in Australia, he returned to Kenya and was hired by Equity Bank Kenya Limited, as a bank teller, at its branch on Moi Avenue in Nairobi, Kenya's capital and largest city. While there, he also worked in the bank's legal department, while he concurrently pursued a law degree from the University of Nairobi.

At the time of his election to the EALA, Kennedy was the Secretary General of the Kalonzo Musyoka Foundation, "which offers scholarships to orphans and children from low-income backgrounds".

Other considerations
At the EALA, he was elected Vice Chairperson of the Kenyan delegation.

See also
List of political parties in Kenya
East African Community

References

External links
Website of the East African Legislative Assembly

1987 births
21st-century Kenyan lawyers
Living people
Kamba people
University of Nairobi alumni
Kenya School of Law alumni
University of Newcastle (Australia) alumni
Wiper Democratic Movement – Kenya politicians
Members of the East African Legislative Assembly